Kansas is a census-designated place in northwestern Liberty Township, Seneca County, Ohio, United States.  It has a post office with the ZIP code 44841.  It is located along State Route 635.

Kansas was platted in early 1855 along a line of the Lake Erie and Louisville Railroad. The community took its name from the Kansas Territory. A short distance south of the community on State Route 635 is the Michaels Farm, which has been named a historic site.

Demographics

References

Census-designated places in Seneca County, Ohio